Walter Maurice Elsasser (March 20, 1904 – October 14, 1991) was a German-born American physicist, a developer of the presently accepted dynamo theory as an explanation of the Earth's magnetism.  He proposed that this magnetic field resulted from electric currents induced in the fluid outer core of the Earth.  He revealed the history of the Earth's magnetic field by the study of the magnetic orientation of minerals in rocks. He was also the first to suggest that the wave-like nature of matter might be investigated by electron scattering experiments using crystalline solids.

The Olin Hall at the Johns Hopkins University has a Walter Elsasser Memorial in the lobby.

Biography
Elsasser was born in 1904 to a Jewish family in Mannheim, Germany.  Before he became known for his geodynamo theory, while in Göttingen during the 1920s, he had suggested the experiment to test the wave aspect of electrons. This suggestion of Elsasser was later communicated by his senior colleague from Göttingen (Nobel Prize recipient Max Born) to physicists in England. This explained the results of the Davisson-Germer and Thomson experiments later awarded with the Nobel Prize in Physics.  In 1935, while working in Paris, Elsasser calculated the binding energies of protons and neutrons in heavy radioactive nuclei.  Wigner, Jensen and Goeppert-Mayer received the Nobel in 1963 for work developing out of Elsasser's initial formulation.  Elsasser therefore came quite close to a Nobel prize on two occasions.

During 1946–47, Elsasser published papers describing the first mathematical model for the origin of the Earth's magnetic field. He conjectured that it could be a self-sustaining dynamo, powered by convection in the liquid outer core, and described a possible feedback mechanism between flows having two different geometries, toroidal and poloidal (indeed, inventing the terms). This had been developed from about 1941 onwards, partly in his spare time during his scientific war service with the U.S. Army Signal Corps.

During his later years, Elsasser became interested in what is now called systems biology and contributed a series of articles to Journal of Theoretical Biology. The final version of his thoughts on this subject can be found in his book Reflections on a Theory of Organisms, published in 1987 and again posthumously with a new foreword by Harry Rubin in 1998.

Elsasser died in 1991 in Baltimore, Maryland, US.

Biotonic laws
A biotonic law, a phrase invented by Elsasser, is a principle of nature which is not contained in the principles of physics.

Biotonic laws may also be considered as local instances of global organismic or organismal principles, such as the Organismic Principle of Natural Selection.

Some, but not all, of Elsasser's theoretical biology work is still quite controversial, and in fact may disagree with several of the basic tenets of current systems biology that he may have helped to develop.  Basic to Elsasser's biological thought is the notion of the great complexity of the cell.  Elsasser deduced from this that any investigation of a causative chain of events in a biological system will reach a "terminal point", where the number of possible inputs into the chain will overwhelm the capacity of the scientist to make predictions, even with the most powerful computers.  This might seem like a counsel of despair, but in fact Elsasser was not suggesting the abandonment of biology as a worthwhile research topic, but rather for a different kind of biology such that molecular causal chains are no longer the main focus of study.  Correlation between supra-molecular events would become the main data source. Moreover, the heterogeneity of logical classes encompassed by all biological organisms without exception
is an important part of Elsasser's legacy to both Complex systems biology and Relational Biology.

Publications 
 The Physical Foundation of Biology.  An Analytical Study, (1958), Pergamon Press, London
 Atom and Organism.  A New Approach to Theoretical Biology, (1966) Princeton University Press
 The Chief Abstractions of Biology, (1975), North Holland, Amsterdam.
 Memoirs of a Physicist in the Atomic Age, (1978)
 The role of individuality in biological theory, (1970) in Towards a Theoretical Biology vol.3 Edinburgh University Press
 Reflections on a Theory of Organisms. Holism in Biology, (1998) Johns Hopkins University Press (JHU).

Awards 

Elsasser was elected to the National Academy of Sciences in 1957. From the American Geophysical Union he received the William Bowie Medal, its highest honor, in 1959; and the John Adam Fleming Medal (for contributions to geomagnetism) in 1971. He received the Penrose Medal from the Geological Society of America in 1979 and the Gauss Medal from Germany in 1977. In 1987, he was awarded the USA's National Medal of Science "for his fundamental and lasting contributions to physics, meteorology, and geophysics in establishing quantum mechanics, atmospheric radiation transfer, planetary magnetism and plate tectonics."

See also
Complex system biology
List of geophysicists
Mathematical and theoretical biology

References

Further reading
 
 
 Beyler R & Gatherer D (2007) Walter Elsasser (biography). In: Dictionary of Scientific Biography, new ed. New York: Charles Scribner's Sons Inc.

External links
 Oral history interview transcript with Walter Elsasser on 29 May 1962, American Institute of Physics, Niels Bohr Library & Archives
 Oral history interview transcript with Walter Elsasser on 21 November 1985, American Institute of Physics, Niels Bohr Library & Archives
  Elsasser's photo

1904 births
1991 deaths
20th-century American physicists
20th-century German physicists
Jewish emigrants from Nazi Germany to the United States
Scientists from Mannheim
People from the Grand Duchy of Baden
Systems biologists
Theoretical biologists
Heidelberg University alumni
Ludwig Maximilian University of Munich alumni
University of Göttingen alumni
National Medal of Science laureates
Scientists from Baltimore
Jewish American scientists
Jewish physicists
Fellows of the American Physical Society